The 2010–11 All-Ireland Junior Club Hurling Championship was the eighth staging of the All-Ireland Junior Club Hurling Championship since its establishment by the Gaelic Athletic Association. The championship ran from 26 September 2010 to 13 February 2011.

The All-Ireland final was played on 13 February 2011 at Croke Park in Dublin, between Meelin from Cork and John Locke's from Kilkenny, in what was their first ever meeting in the final. Meelin won the match by 0-12 to 1-05 to claim their first ever championship title.

Meelin's Éamonn Brosnan was the championship's top scorer with 3-39.

Connacht Junior Club Hurling Championship

Connacht semi-final

Connacht final

Leinster Junior Club Hurling Championship

Leinster first round

Leinster quarter-finals

Leinster semi-finals

Leinster final

Munster Junior Club Hurling Championship

Munster quarter-final

Munster semi-finals

Munster final

Ulster Junior Club Hurling Championship

Ulster preliminary round

Ulster quarter-finals

Ulster semi-finals

Ulster final

All-Ireland Junior Club Hurling Championship

All-Ireland quarter-final

All-Ireland semi-finals

All-Ireland final

Championship statistics

Top scorers

Overall

Miscellaneous

 A dispute over the eligibility of a Western Gaels player in the Sligo SHC final delayed the Connacht Championship for several months. The dispute, which lasted for several months, went before the Sligo County Board and Connacht Council, before the DRA ruled against Western Gaels.

References

All-Ireland Junior Club Hurling Championship
All-Ireland Junior Club Hurling Championship
2009